The Ukraine women's national basketball team represents Ukraine in international women's basketball matches. They are controlled by the Basketball Federation of Ukraine (FBU).

As of late 2019, its team captain has been Alina Iagupova.

Tournament record

Olympic Games
1996 – 4th place

EuroBasket Women
1995 – First place
1997 – 10th place
2001 – 11th place
2003 – 11th place
2009 – 13th place
2013 – 16th place
2015 – 16th place
2017 – 10th place
2019 – 16th place

Current roster
Roster for the FIBA Women's EuroBasket 2019.

Head coach position
 Goran Boskovic (2017–2019)
 Srdjan Radulovic (2019–present)

See also
Ukraine men's national basketball team

References

External links
Official website
FIBA profile
Archived records of Ukraine team participations

 
 
Women's national basketball teams